Cadphises maculata is a moth of the family Zygaenidae. It is found in south-east Asia, including north-eastern India, northern Vietnam and Laos.

External links
JPmoths

Chalcosiinae
Moths described in 1865